Gazi Baba is one of the ten municipalities that make up the City of Skopje, the capital of North Macedonia. The municipality administration consists of a council and mayor.

Name
The name of the municipality comes from the nickname of the Ottoman poet Aşık Çelebi. In Turkish, Gazi means "war veteran" and baba means "father".

Geography
The municipality borders Petrovec Municipality, Studeničani Municipality and Aerodrom Municipality to the south, Centar Municipality, Čair Municipality and Butel Municipality to the west, Lipkovo Municipality to the northeast, and Aračinovo Municipality and Ilinden Municipality to the east.

Demographics
According to the last national census from 2021, the municipality has 69,626 inhabitants making it the most populous municipality in Greater Skopje. Ethnic groups in the municipality include:

Inhabited places

There are 15 inhabited places in this municipality.

Sports
Football clubs FK Skopje and FK Metalurg Skopje play their home games at the Železarnica Stadium in Gazi Baba.

References

External links

Official website

 
Municipalities of North Macedonia
Municipalities of Skopje